Den sista cigaretten (lit. The Last Cigarette) is the twelfth novel by Swedish author Klas Östergren. It was published in 2009.

References

External links

2009 Swedish novels
Novels by Klas Östergren
Swedish-language novels
Novels set in Stockholm
Albert Bonniers Förlag books